Daniela Anguita Loux (born 27 June 1984) is a Chilean former alpine skier. She competed in the women's super-G at the 2006 Winter Olympics.

References

External links
 

1984 births
Living people
Chilean female alpine skiers
Olympic alpine skiers of Chile
Alpine skiers at the 2006 Winter Olympics
Sportspeople from Barcelona
21st-century Chilean women